

Bahiyyih Nakhjavani is an Iranian writer who grew up in Uganda in the 1960s. She was educated at Dr Williams School, Dolgellau, United Kingdom and the United States. She taught European and American literature in Belgium, and later moved to France, where she teaches.

In 2007, Bahiyyih Nakhjavani received the honorary doctorate Doctorats Honoris Causa from the University of Liège. Her books have been translated into many languages.

Life 
She was born in 1948. Bahiyyih Nakhjavani was born in Iran, grew up in Uganda and was educated in Britain. She earned a PhD at the University of Massachusetts at Amherst in 1978.

Family 
Although originally from Nakhchivan, her father Ali Nakhjavani was born in 1919 in Baku, the capital of the Azerbaijan Democratic Republic. Ali Nakhchivani, whose mother was Palestinian, moved to Palestine after the death of his father, and after growing up there, he went to Uganda in 1951 to spread the Bahá'í Faith. Ali Nakhjavani's father, Ali Akbar Nakhcivani, was from Ordubad, Nakhchivan district of Azerbaijan.

Novels
Her first novel The Saddlebag - A Fable for Doubters and Seekers was an international bestseller. It describes events set in the Najd plateau along the pilgrim route between Mecca and Medina during one day in 1844-1845, when a mysterious saddlebag passes from hand to hand, and influences the lives of each person who comes across it. Inspired by Chapter VII of The Dawn-Breakers by Nabíl-i-Aʻzam, where the Bab - the forerunner to Baha'u'llah, the Founder of the Baháʼí Faith - has His saddlebag stolen while travelling to Mecca and Medina for pilgrimage. The main characters are the Thief, the Bride, the Chieftain, the Moneychanger, the Slave, the Pilgrim, the Priest, the Dervish and the Corpse. 

The novel Paper - The Dreams of A Scribe is an allegory centered on a Scribe who is searching for perfect paper for writing his masterpiece. It is set in Máh-Kú, a bordertown in north-west Persia, between the Summer of 1847 and the Spring of 1848. It contains 19 chapters which are structured symmetrically around five dreams. Other main characters are the Mullah, the Widow, the Warden, his Mother and his Daughter, and the Prisoner.

Her third novel The Woman Who Read Too Much is also set in the middle of the nineteenth century, and centers around Tahirih Qurratu'l-Ayn, a poet and scholar from Qazvin, who shocked the political powers of Qajar Persia and violated religious convention by casting aside her veil.  This protagonist is a heroine from early Baháʼí/Babi history and was one of the Bab's early followers who were known as the Letters of the Living. This novel is divided into four parts with revolving points of view, of mother, sister, daughter and wife respectively. It traces the capture, incarceration, torture and final execution of the central figure of the mysterious poet while exploring her impact on mayor, minister, mullah and monarch in a world of intrigue and corruption in Qajar Persia. The book has been translated into French, Italian in 2007 and will be out in Korean and Spanish by 2008/9; it was nominated for the 2008 Latifeh Yarshater Award, and has been published in English by Stanford University Press in 2015.

Bibliography

Novels

 Bahiyyih Nakhjavani (2017). Us & Them. Stanford, CA: Redwood Press. .

Other books

Augusto López-Claros and Bahiyyih Nakhjavani (2018). Equality for Women = Prosperity for All: The Disastrous Global Crisis of Gender Inequality. New York, NY: St. Martin's Press. .

Further reading/viewing

See also
 Baháʼí Faith in fiction
 Declaration of Independence (Azerbaijan), Contemporary history of Azerbaijan, Greater Iran

References

External links
 Official website
 Novels and Iranian History: Beyond Diaspora, a public lecture and reading by Bahiyyih Nakhjavani, Ecole Superieure des Arts Decoratifs de Strasbourg, France, April 16, 2008.
 Interview in English/Italian on RAI3, about herself and her writing

Year of birth missing (living people)
Living people
20th-century Bahá'ís
21st-century Bahá'ís
Iranian women writers
Iranian people of Azerbaijani descent